Back on the Planet is a studio album by American hip hop producer Ras G. It was released through Brainfeeder on August 6, 2013.

Critical reception

At Metacritic, which assigns a normalized rating out of 100 to reviews from critics, the album received an average score of 70, based on 9 reviews, indicating "generally favorable reviews".

Bram E. Gieben of The Skinny gave the album 4 out of 5 stars, calling it "a perfect, psychedelic hybrid of dusty LA beat-scene boom-bap and the cosmic jazz excursions of the Sun Ra Arkestra." Daryl Keating of Exclaim! said: "Paradoxically fusing ancient, grinding rhythms and ultra-modern, plush beats, Back on the Planet skips between two distant eras while actively laughing at everything in the middle."

Meanwhile, Gary Suarez of PopMatters gave the album 4 out of 10 stars, writing: "A glorified beat tape, for better or worse, it plays out like a pirate radio transmission from some collapsing Afro-Caribbean wormhole, broadcasting the sort of intemperate tinkering one might tolerate from a Wolf Eyes side project." Lainna Fader of XLR8R commented that the album "is merely a collection of somewhat compelling, hip-hop-leaning beats that largely go nowhere; it's more like a dressed-up beat tape, and not a particularly exciting one at that."

Track listing

References

External links
 

2013 albums
Brainfeeder albums
Hip hop albums by American artists